Metze is a German surname. Notable people with the surname include:

Erich Metze (1909–1952), German professional cyclist
Karin Metze (born 1956), German rower
Marie Metze (born 1938), American politician

See also
Faule Metze, medieval supergun of the city of Brunswick, Germany

German-language surnames